Keith Oatley FRSC, FBPsS (16 March 1939) is an Anglo-Canadian novelist, and professor emeritus of cognitive psychology at the University of Toronto. His novel The Case of Emily V won the 1994 Commonwealth Prize for first novel.

Life
Born in London, he was awarded a First in Psychology from the University of Cambridge, and a PhD in Psychology from University College London.
He completed a post-doctoral year in Engineering in Medicine at Imperial College London.
He moved to Canada in 1990.

Works
; Keith Oatley, 2007,  
A natural history: a novel, Viking, 1998,  
Therefore Choose, Goose Lane Editions, 2010,

Non-fiction
Brain mechanisms and mind, Dutton, 1972 
Perceptions and representations Methuen, 1978,  
Selves in relation, Methuen, 1984,

References

External links

Author's website
Author's blog
Author's Psychology Today blog

Canadian psychologists
Canadian male novelists
English psychologists
English male novelists
Alumni of University College London
Alumni of the University of Cambridge
Academic staff of the University of Toronto
Living people
English emigrants to Canada
1939 births